Wainoni is the name of two places in New Zealand:

 Wainoni, Auckland, a suburb of Auckland
 Wainoni, Christchurch, a suburb of Christchurch, Canterbury